Kosmin or Kośmin may refer to:
 Kośmin, Lublin Voivodeship, a village in eastern Poland in Puławy County
 Kośmin, Masovian Voivodeship a village in east-central Poland in Grójec County
 Paul J. Kosmin, a historian who studies the Seleucid Empire
 Barry Kosmin, a professor of public policy and scholar of religion & culture, specifically groups unattached or only loosely attached to religion